Stuart Anthony (1891–1942) was an American screenwriter. He worked on the screenplays of two Charlie Chan films.

Selected filmography
 The Floating College (1928)
 Stool Pigeon (1928)
 The Fighting Sheriff (1931)
 Desert Vengeance (1931)
 Police Court (1932)
 Whistlin' Dan (1932)
 End of the Trail (1932)
 Strangers of the Evening (1932)
 Lena Rivers (1932)
 State Trooper (1933)
 Silent Men (1933)
 Love Is Dangerous (1933)
 The Whirlwind (1933)
 Nothing More Than a Woman (1934)
 Frontier Marshal (1934)
 Happy Landing (1934)
 Charlie Chan in London (1934)
 Charlie Chan in Paris (1935)
 Motive for Revenge (1935)
 Mutiny Ahead (1935)
 Burning Gold (1936)
 Desert Gold (1936)
 Illegal Traffic (1938)
 Tom Sawyer, Detective (1938)
 Saga of Death Valley (1939)
 The Biscuit Eater (1940)
 The Ranger and the Lady (1940)
 Along the Rio Grande (1941)
 The Monster and the Girl (1941)
 The Shepherd of the Hills (1941)

References

Bibliography
 Jeff Jaeckle. Film Dialogue. Columbia University Press, 25 Jun 2013.

External links

1891 births
1942 deaths
People from Georgia (U.S. state)
20th-century American screenwriters